Frederick Glover Craig (16 January 1891 – 30 August 1966) was a Scottish professional footballer who played as a goalkeeper, best remembered for his two spells with Plymouth Argyle, for whom he made over 430 appearances in the Southern League and the Football League. Craig made more appearances for the club than any other goalkeeper.

Club career 
A goalkeeper, Craig began his career in Scottish junior football, before moving to England to join Southern League First Division club Plymouth Argyle in 1912. He made just four appearances during the 1912–13 season, in which Argyle won the Southern League First Division title. He succeeded Titch Horne as Argyle's first choice goalkeeper midway through 1914–15, but the outbreak of the First World War in August 1914 led to the cessation of competitive football in England at the end of the season, for the duration of the conflict.

Craig returned to Scotland to play competitive Scottish League football during the war and turned out for several clubs (most notably Hamilton Academical and Motherwell), before re-joining Plymouth Argyle in time for the beginning of the 1919–20 season. Argyle were elevated into the Football League Third Division for the 1920–21 season and Craig remained with the club until the end of the 1929–30 season, when he captained the team to the Third Division South championship. During his 14 seasons at Home Park, Craig made 467 appearances and scored five goals. Towards the end of his Argyle career, he occasionally filled in as the team's penalty taker. Craig finished his career with a short spell at Third Division North club Barrow.

International career 
In 1923, Craig was selected for the Home Scots v Anglo-Scots international trial match alongside Plymouth Argyle teammate Patsy Corcoran (with whom he had also played at Hamilton Academical), though neither gained a full cap.

Career statistics

Honours
Plymouth Argyle
Southern League First Division: 1912–13
Football League Third Division South: 1929–30

References

1891 births
Sportspeople from Larkhall
Scottish footballers
Association football goalkeepers
Larkhall Thistle F.C. players
Plymouth Argyle F.C. players
Barrow A.F.C. players
Southern Football League players
English Football League players
Footballers from South Lanarkshire
Brentford F.C. wartime guest players
1970 deaths
Scottish Football League players
Larkhall United F.C. players
Royal Albert F.C. players
St Johnstone F.C. players
Vale of Leven F.C. players
Hamilton Academical F.C. players
Ayr United F.C. players
Clydebank F.C. (1914) players
Motherwell F.C. players